Aenictophyton is a genus of flowering plants in the legume family, Fabaceae. It belongs to the subfamily Faboideae.

Species
Aenictophyton comprises the following species:
 Aenictophyton reconditum A.T.Lee

Species names with uncertain taxonomic status
The status of the following species is unresolved:
 Aenictophyton anomalum (F.Muell.) I.Thomps.

References

Mirbelioids
Fabaceae genera